Tuapait Island is an uninhabited island in the Qikiqtaaluk Region of Nunavut, Canada. It is one of the Kikastan Islands, located in the Cumberland Sound, off Baffin Island's Cumberland Peninsula. To its south lie Akulagok Island and Kekerten Island. Aupaluktok Island, Beacon Island, Kekertukdjuak Island, Miliakdjuin Island, Tesseralik Island, and Ugpitimik Island are in the vicinity.

References

External links 
 Tuapait Island in the Atlas of Canada - Toporama; Natural Resources Canada

Islands of Baffin Island
Islands of Cumberland Sound
Uninhabited islands of Qikiqtaaluk Region